Boshruyeh County is in South Khorasan province, Iran. The capital of the county is the city of Boshruyeh. At the 2006 census, the region's population (as Boshruyeh District of Ferdows County) was 23,045 in 6,240 households.  The district was detached from Ferdows County in November 2008 to become Boshruyeh County. The following census in 2011 counted 24,683 people in 7,200 households. At the 2016 census, the county's population was 26,064 in 8,255 households.

History
There are several historical buildings in Boshrouyeh and its surroundings. Based on historical books, the city has existed for at least for 700 years. Some of the most famous buildings are:
 Qale’ye Dokhtar (Girl's Castle): This citadel is located on top of a mountain in the west of the city. It has been reported that this huge and ancient building is a state edifice from the period of Ismaili governance in this region.
Hosseinieh Haj Ali Ashraf: This building has Indian architectural features and is used for “religious mourning rites” during the month of Muharram.
Masjed Miandeh (City-Center Mosque): This a state edifice from the period of Ismaili governance.
The mosque dates back to 400 years.
Saray-e Serke: This ancient and simple house is well known and used for holding religious mourning ceremonies.

Administrative divisions

The population history and structural changes of Boshruyeh County's administrative divisions over three consecutive censuses are shown in the following table. The latest census shows two districts, four rural districts, and two cities.

References

 

Counties of South Khorasan Province